Nikita Alexeyevich Okhotiuk (born 4 December 2000) is a Russian professional ice hockey defenceman for the San Jose Barracuda of the American Hockey League (AHL) as a prospect to the San Jose Sharks of the National Hockey League (NHL).

Playing career
Okhotiuk played in his native Russia as a youth with Belye Medvedi of the Junior Hockey League (MHL) before continuing his development in North America with the Ottawa 67's of the Ontario Hockey League (OHL).

He was drafted by the New Jersey Devils with the 61st overall pick in the second round of the 2019 NHL Entry Draft. In the following 2019–20 season, Okhotiuk was signed by the Devils to a three-year, entry-level contract on 30 December 2019.

During his second professional season within the Devils organization in 2021–22, Okhotiuk was recalled from AHL affiliate, the Utica Comets, and made his NHL debut for the Devils on 21 April 2022, and notched his first career NHL goal in a 5–2 loss to the Buffalo Sabres.

In the following 2022–23 season, Okhotiuk was traded by the Devils to the San Jose Sharks on 26 February 2023, as part of a multi-player deal, in which the Devils received Timo Meier.

Career statistics

Regular season and playoffs

International

References

External links
 

2000 births
Living people
Belye Medvedi Chelyabinsk players
Binghamton Devils players
New Jersey Devils draft picks
New Jersey Devils players
Ottawa 67's players
Utica Comets players